Kai Hospelt (born August 23, 1985) is a German professional ice hockey player currently playing for the Ravensburg Towerstars of the DEL2. He was an Olympian at the 2010 Olympic Winter Games in Vancouver, British Columbia, Canada.

Playing career
Kai Hospelt's career started in 2002 in the Deutsche Eishockey Liga for his hometown Kölner Haie. After his first year in the DEL he was drafted by the San Jose Sharks in the 2003 NHL Entry Draft. Hospelt never made it to the Sharks squad, but played for five more seasons in Cologne. After six total seasons with the Sharks, he moved onto the Grizzly Adams Wolfsburg where he spent five seasons and his last two as Captain of the Grizzly Adams until the conclusion of the 2012–13 season.

On April 12, 2013, at the conclusion of his contract with Wolfsburg, Hospelt was signed to a three-year contract with Adler Mannheim. Following the 2015–16 campaign, he returned to his hometown team Kölner Haie.

Hospelt played a further three seasons with Kölner Haie before leaving the club as a free agent following the 2018–19 season. He agreed to a one-year contract with his fourth DEL club, Krefeld Pinguine, on April 17, 2019.

International play
Hospelt has represented Germany's national team on numerous occasions. Twice (in 2002 and 2003) he played for Team Germany in the IIHF World U18 Championships. Three times (in 2003, 2004, and 2005) he represented them in the World Junior Championships. Six times (in 2009, 2010, 2011, 2012, 2014, 2015) he suited up for the national team in the World Championships. The largest honour came in 2010, when he suited up in the Olympic Games in Vancouver in 2010 and score one assist in four games as Germany fell in the qualification round. Having won 115 caps for the German men's national team, he announced his retirement from international ice hockey in July 2017.

Career statistics

Regular season and playoffs

International

References

External links

1985 births
Living people
Adler Mannheim players
Grizzlys Wolfsburg players
German ice hockey forwards
Kölner Haie players
Krefeld Pinguine players
Ice hockey players at the 2010 Winter Olympics
Olympic ice hockey players of Germany
Ravensburg Towerstars players
San Jose Sharks draft picks
Sportspeople from Cologne